Hillburn, originally called "Woodburn" and incorporated in 1893, is a village in the town of Ramapo, Rockland County, New York, United States. It is located north of Suffern, east of Orange County, south of Viola, and west of Montebello. It is considered to be one of the more rural communities in Rockland County. The population was 951 at the 2010 census.

History
In addition to later European-American migrants, the area was settled early by descendants of Lenape and other remnant groups, who eventually intermarried with Afro-Dutch and other ethnicities after the Revolutionary War. These multiracial descendants were recognized in 1980 by the state as the Ramapough Mountain Indians; they also have centers of population in Mahwah and Ringwood, New Jersey, which were areas of frontier in the eighteenth and early nineteenth centuries. For many years they lived by farming, hunting and fishing. They tended to marry within their community until the mid-twentieth century.

The village of Hillburn was founded in 1893; that year the first school in Hillburn was built on a plot of ground donated by J.B. Suffern.

Thurgood Marshall

In 1943, the attorney Thurgood Marshall won a disparity case regarding integration of the schools of Hillburn, 11 years before his landmark case of Brown v. Board of Education. He represented the village's African-American parents.  In 2010, the state legislature designated May 17 as Thurgood Marshall Day in honor of his work in civil rights.  Mixed-race children who lived in the town of Ramapo attended the Brook School in Hillburn, a wood structure that did not have a library, indoor bathrooms or gymnasium. The Main School was reserved for white children and included a gymnasium, a library and indoor plumbing. It is now used as the headquarters of the Suffern Central School District.  The Rockland African Diaspora Heritage Center in Pomona, New York, has an exhibit of artifacts and photographs loaned by a student who attended the Brook School. The student went on to college, and eventually taught English and history.

Geography
Hillburn is adjacent to the New Jersey border, on the southeastern edge of the Ramapo Mountains. It is immediately south of Harriman and Sterling Forest state parks. The village is bisected by the Ramapo River.

Demographics

As of the census of 2000, there were 881 people, 273 households, and 221 families residing in the village. The population density was 395.5 people per square mile (152.5/km2). There were 290 housing units at an average density of 130.2 per square mile (50.2/km2). The racial makeup of the village was 49.04% white, 11.12% African American, 14.42% Native American, 4.31% Asian, 0.68% Pacific Islander, 2.38% from other races, and 18.05% from two or more races. Hispanic or Latino of any race were 5.56% of the population.

There were 273 households, out of which 39.6% had children under the age of 18 living with them, 53.5% were married couples living together, 24.5% had a female householder with no husband present, and 18.7% were non-families. 16.8% of all households were made up of individuals, and 5.9% had someone living alone who was 65 years of age or older. The average household size was 3.23 and the average family size was 3.58.

In the village, the population was spread out, with 28.4% under the age of 18, 8.5% from 18 to 24, 28.5% from 25 to 44, 20.4% from 45 to 64, and 14.2% who were 65 years of age or older. The median age was 36 years. For every 100 females, there were 81.6 males. For every 100 females age 18 and over, there were 78.8 males.

The median income for a household in the village was $54,625, and the median income for a family was $56,875. Males had a median income of $36,591 versus $30,000 for females. The per capita income for the village was $17,516. About 10.7% of families and 14.8% of the population were below the poverty line, including 27.0% of those under age 18 and 17.3% of those age 65 or over.

Education 
The village of Hillburn is located within the Suffern Central School District, and is where the district's administrative building is located. Students from grades K-5 are zoned to Montebello Elementary School in Suffern, NY Students in grades 6-8 are zoned to Suffern Middle School, and high school students are zoned to Suffern High School.

Tourism

Historical markers

 Post at Ramapough/Sidman’s Bridge - Route 17
 Site of Camp Ramapaugh and Intrenchments - Torne Valley Road
 Site of Kellogg & Maurice Railroad Bridge - Route 59
 Thurgood Marshall - 45 Mountain Avenue
 William W. Snow House, Fourth Street & Terrace Avenue

Landmarks and places of interest
Brook Chapel - historic chapel, 1893 (NRHP)

Sources
 Penford, Saxby Voulaer., "Romantic Suffern - The History of Suffern, New York, from the Earliest Times to the Incorporation of the Village in 1896", Tallman, N.Y., 1955, (1st Edition)

References

External links
 Village of Hillburn official website

Ramapos
Villages in New York (state)
Villages in Rockland County, New York